Walter Scott, 1st Earl of Tarras (23 December 1644 – 9 April 1693) was a Scottish nobleman. Born Walter Scott of Highchester, he married his kinswoman Mary Scott, 3rd Countess of Buccleuch, daughter of Francis Scott, 2nd Earl of Buccleuch and Lady Margaret Leslie, on 9 February 1659 in Wemyss, Fife. She died in 1661 and the couple had no children. He married Helen Hepburn of Humbie in 1677, and they had a number of children. He was granted the titles Earl of Tarras and Baron Almoor and Campcastill in the Peerage of Scotland in 1660. These were early examples of a life peerage, being granted "for the days of his natural life", to make Walter Scott of equal rank to his wife. In 1685 he was attainted, but restored in 1687.

References

1644 births
1693 deaths
Earls in the Peerage of Scotland
Life peers created by Charles II
Members of the Convention of the Estates of Scotland 1689
17th-century Scottish peers